Jia Zongyang (born 1 March 1991 in Fushun, Liaoning, China) is a Chinese aerial skier. He competed for China at the 2010, 2014, and 2018 Winter Olympics, winning a bronze medal in 2014 and a silver in 2018. At the 2010 Olympic Games in Vancouver, 18-year-old Jia Zongyang showed the best result in qualifying but took only sixth place in the final. He also competed at the 2022 Winter Olympics.

References

External links 
 
 
 
 
 

1991 births
Living people
Chinese male freestyle skiers
Olympic freestyle skiers of China
Freestyle skiers at the 2010 Winter Olympics
Freestyle skiers at the 2014 Winter Olympics
Freestyle skiers at the 2018 Winter Olympics
Freestyle skiers at the 2022 Winter Olympics
Olympic medalists in freestyle skiing
Medalists at the 2014 Winter Olympics
Medalists at the 2018 Winter Olympics
Medalists at the 2022 Winter Olympics
Olympic silver medalists for China
Olympic bronze medalists for China
Asian Games medalists in freestyle skiing
Freestyle skiers at the 2011 Asian Winter Games
Asian Games gold medalists for China
Medalists at the 2011 Asian Winter Games
Universiade medalists in freestyle skiing
Universiade gold medalists for China
Competitors at the 2009 Winter Universiade
People from Fushun
Skiers from Liaoning
21st-century Chinese people